A khanqah or khangah (also transliterated as khankah, khaneqa, khanegah or khaneqah; also Arabized hanegah, hanikah, hanekah, khankan), also known as a ribat, is a building designed specifically for gatherings of a Sufi brotherhood or tariqa and is a place for spiritual practice and religious education. The khanqah is typically a large structure with a central hall and smaller rooms on either side. Traditionally, the kahnqah was state-sponsored housing for Sufis. Their primary function is to provide them with a space to practice social lives of asceticism. Buildings intended for public services, such as hospitals, kitchens, and lodging, are often attached to them. Khanqahs were funded by Ayyubid sultans in Syria, Zangid sultans in Egypt, and Delhi sultans in India in return for Sufi support of their regimes.

Etymology 
The word khanqah is likely either Turkish or Persian in origin. In the Arab world, especially North Africa, the khanqah is known as a zāwiyah (plural zāwiyāt; also transliterated as zawiya, zāwiya or zaouia). In the former regions of the Ottoman Empire, they are locally referred to as tekke in Turkish (from Ottoman Turkish , alternative form of  tekye), teqeja in Albanian, tekija in Bosnian, and  takiyya in Arabic. In South Asia, the words khanqah and dargah are used interchangeably for Sufi shrines. Scholars in the Mamluk world often did not differentiate between khanqahs, ribats, zawiyas, and madrasas.

Architecture

Prior to the Timurid period, khanqahs were typically designed as large complexes with several structures. After the fourteenth century, they were more commonly designed as one large structure. This design is typically characterized by one large hall with cells or galleries on either side, allowing more interaction for those working in the khanqah. They commonly have domes, mosaics, arches, columns, courtyards, portals, and minarets. The design and incorporation of these aspects varies by region and era.

Function 
The patronage of Sufi khanqahs historically made an important political and cultural statement. The patronage of a Sufi building by a ruler showed their support for Sufi religious practices and the spreading of Islam. Funding a Sufi building was seen as an act of piety and a way in which the ruler could align themselves with public opinion.

Khanqahs are often associated with dargahs of a tombs of Sufi saints or shaykhs. Typically, they feature a large hall where practitioners could pray and meditate. They also include lodgings for traveling Sufis and pilgrims.In addition to their religious spaces, khanqahs also had structures for public services. This included hospitals, kitchens, bathhouses, and schools. Everyone working to provide these services was paid through a waqf.

Although khanqahs are Sufi structures, they are very inclusive. Visitors from different cultures and religions could visit the khanqah and receive a blessing.

Traditionally, sufi communal lives of asceticism were seen as pious because solitude and self-sufficiency were believed to lead to ego-centricity. Penitence and suffering were intended to bring Sufis closer to understanding divinity.

History

Khanqah in Syria 
Nur al-Din was the first large patron of Sufi structures, he built and gifted khanqahs to Sufi groups in his dominion. In Damascus, khanqahs were located inside as well as outside of the city walls. Under the Zangids, khanqahs were very centrally located in Old Damascus, near the Umayyad Mosque. Khanqahs are very commonly placed near a Madrasa that is dedicated to the same patron as the khanqah. The main purpose of the khanqah was for legal education.

 Most, including Nur al-Din's khanqah, included hospices. However, there was a deep interconnection between education and religion in Sufi buildings, by the end of the Mamluk period the distinction between religious and educational buildings became blurred.

Khanqah in Egypt 
Saladin founded the first khanqah in Cairo, Egypt in 1173. This officially marked his defeat of the Fatimids, who were largely Shi’ite, and the beginning of the Ayyubid period of Sunnism. In 1325, the Mamluk sultan al-Nāṣir Muḥammad relocated the khanqah north of the city. Saladin changed the Sa'Td al-Su'ada, a Fatimid palace, into a Sufi khanqah called al-khänqäh al-salähiyya (not to be confused with the Al-Khanqah al-Salahiyya Mosque in Jerusalem). This khanqah provided a place to stay for Sufis who were not from Cairo. It was provided by Saladin based on the exchange of Sufis supporting the Ayyubid dynasty and policies.

Saladin also created the role of the Chief Sufi, whose job was to operate activities from day to day and mentor the Sufis that lived in and visited the khanqah. There was a lot of competition for this role due to its great degree of influence. The Chief Sufi maintained a close relationship with the Ayyubid Sultan, obtained military power and influence, and had the ability to teach at the Madrasas in the area. The Sultan gave a large degree of power to the Sufis in Cairo as part of an important trade off for political support which was incredibly important in solidifying the legitimacy of the Sultan's rule.

Khanqah in India 
Madrasa-i-Firozshahi was built by Sultan Firoz Shah Tughlaq near Hauz-i-Alai. Its architecture was said to be so appealing to locals that they relocated to be closer to the complex. The khanqah-madrasa structure had educational opportunities for the pious, and teachers were paid with stipends. Its main purpose was to offer lodging for travelers.

The khanqah of Sayed Ghulam Ali Shah Mashadi in India was visited by and open to pilgrims from many different cultures around the world. Khanqahs had langarkhanas, which served as free public kitchens for the poor sponsored by endowments from lakhiraj lands. Islamic values of equality and fraternity brough khanqahs to provide services for members of the lowest castes. The popularity of khanqahs declined in the early 14th century in India.

See also
 Islamic architecture
 Ottoman architecture
 Architecture of Iran
 Historical tekkes, zawiyas, and dergahs in Istanbul

References

Further reading
 
 Hattstein, M. and P. Delius — Islam: Art and Architecture, 2000, .

External links
ḴĀNAQĀH. Encyclopedia Iranica.
"Khanaqah" article in Oxford Islamic Studies Online

Sufi shrines
Sufism in India
Sufism in Pakistan
Islamic architecture
Ribats
Islamic terminology
Islamic education